The 2000–01 Copa Federación de España was the eighth staging of the Copa Federación de España, a knockout competition for Spanish football clubs in Segunda División B and Tercera División.

The Regional stages began in 2000, while the national tournament took place from November 2000 to April 2001.

Regional tournaments

Asturias tournament

National tournament

Preliminary round

|}
Castellón and Puertollano received a bye.

Round of 16

|}

Quarter-finals

|}

Semifinals

|}

Final

|}

References
2000–2009 Copa Federación results
Asturias tournament results

Copa Federación de España seasons